Jean Whitehead (born 1937) is a female former athlete who competed for England.

Athletics career
She represented England in the long jump at the 1958 British Empire and Commonwealth Games in Cardiff, Wales.

She was a member of the Liverpool Harriers & AC and aged just 18 established a new record of 18 ft 9ins (5.71 m) in winning the Northern Senior title in 1955.

References

1937 births
Living people
English female long jumpers
Athletes (track and field) at the 1958 British Empire and Commonwealth Games
Commonwealth Games competitors for England